A Wireless powerline sensor hangs from an overhead power line and sends measurements to a data collection system. Because the sensor does not contact anything but a single live conductor, no high-voltage isolation is needed.  The sensor, installed simply by clamping it around a conductor, powers itself from energy scavenged from electrical or magnetic fields surrounding the conductor being measured. Overhead power line monitoring helps distribution system operators provide reliable service at optimized cost.

Communication

In the photos on the right, an antenna on the sensor transmits data to a communication device attached to a nearby utility pole.  The communication device gets power from the 240 volt utility line in a residential neighborhood.  The device has two antennas.  One antenna collects data from the sensors, and the other antenna forwards the data to the electrical utility control center over cell phone service.

In some systems, powerline sensors may transmit information on the high voltage conductor itself rather than by transmission of a radio signal.

Measurements
The primary purpose of a powerline sensor is to measure current, however, some sensors can either directly measure or derive other data such as:

Conductor temperature
Ambient temperature
Inclination or the amount of line sagging
Wind movement
Electric fields
Power Generation
Distribution and Consumption of electricity

See also
Energy management system
List of wireless sensor nodes
Sensor node
Supervisory control and data acquisition
Wireless sensor network

References
6. Patel N., Kumar S. (2017),. "Enhanced Clear Channel Assessment for Slotted CSMA/CA in IEEE 802.15. 4", Springer       

Wireless Personal Communications, Vol. 95, No. 4, pp 4063–4081. https://link.springer.com/article/10.1007/s11277- 017-4042-5

External links

A Wireless Sensors Suite for Smart Grid Applications
Power Line Monitoring for Energy Demand Control
Specifications for a commercially available product

Electric power distribution
Wireless sensor network
Electric power transmission systems